Carruth Plaza is a Western sculpture garden in Houston, Texas.  It is part of NRG Park.  Completed in 2003, the plaza was named after Allen H. "Buddy" Carruth, former chairman of the Houston Livestock Show and Rodeo.

External links
 Hermes Architects page on Carruth Plaza

Sculpture gardens, trails and parks in the United States
Parks in Houston
Culture of Houston